Charles Hodge (December 27, 1797 – June 19, 1878) was a Reformed Presbyterian theologian and principal of Princeton Theological Seminary between 1851 and 1878.

He was a leading exponent of the Princeton Theology, an orthodox Calvinist theological tradition in America during the 19th century. He argued strongly for the authority of the Bible as the Word of God. Many of his ideas were adopted in the 20th century by Fundamentalists and Evangelicals.

Biography 
Charles Hodge's father, Hugh, was the son of a Scotsman who emigrated from Northern Ireland early in the eighteenth century.

Hugh graduated from Princeton College in 1773 and served as a military surgeon in the Revolutionary War, after which he practiced medicine in Philadelphia.

He married well-born Bostonian orphan Mary Blanchard in 1790. The Hodge's first three sons died in the Yellow Fever Epidemic of 1793 and another yellow fever epidemic in 1795. Their first son to survive childhood, Hugh Lenox, was born in 1796. Hugh Lenox would become an authority in obstetrics, and he would remain especially close with Charles, often assisting him financially. Charles was born on December 27, 1797. His father died seven months later of complications from the yellow fever he had contracted in the epidemic of 1795. They were brought up by relatives, many of whom were wealthy and influential. Mary Hodge made sacrifices and took in boarders in order to put the boys through school. She, with the help of the family's minister Ashbel Green, also provided the customary Presbyterian religious education using the Westminster Shorter Catechism. They moved to Somerville, New Jersey in 1810 in order to attend a classical academy, and again to Princeton in 1812 in order to enter Princeton College, a school originally organized to train Presbyterian ministers. As Charles prepared to enter the college, Princeton Theological Seminary was being established by the Presbyterian Church as a separate institution for training ministers in response to a perceived inadequacy in the training ministers were receiving at the university as well as the perception that the college was drifting from orthodoxy. Also in 1812, Ashbel Green, the Hodge's old minister, became president of the college.

At Princeton, the first president of the new seminary, Archibald Alexander, took a special interest in Hodge, assisting him in Greek and taking him with him on itinerant preaching trips. Hodge would name his first son after Alexander. Hodge became close friends with future Episcopalian bishops John Johns and Charles McIlvaine, and future Princeton College president John Mclean. In 1815, during a time of intense religious fervor among the students encouraged by Green and Alexander, Hodge joined the local Presbyterian church and decided to enter the ministry. Shortly after completing his undergraduate studies he entered the seminary in 1816. The course of study was very rigorous, requiring students to recite scripture in the original languages and to use the dogmatics written in Latin in the 17th century by Reformed scholastic Francis Turretin as a theological textbook. Professors Alexander and Samuel Miller also inculcated an intense piety in their students.

Following graduation from Princeton Seminary in 1819, Hodge received additional instruction privately from Hebrew scholar Rev. Joseph Bates in Philadelphia. He was licensed to preach by the Presbytery of Philadelphia in 1820, and he preached regularly as a missionary in vacant pulpits in the East Falls neighborhood of Philadelphia, the Frankford Arsenal in Philadelphia, and Woodbury, New Jersey over the subsequent months. In 1820 he accepted a one-year appointment as assistant professor at Princeton Seminary to teach biblical languages. In October of that year he traveled throughout New England to speak with professors and ministers including Moses Stuart at Andover Seminary and Nathaniel W. Taylor at Yale Divinity School. In 1821 he was ordained a minister by the Presbytery of New Brunswick, and in 1822 he published his first pamphlet, which allowed Alexander to convince the General Assembly to appoint him full Professor of Oriental and Biblical Literature. Financially stable, Hodge married Sarah Bache, Benjamin Franklin's great-granddaughter in the same year. In 1824, Hodge helped to found the Chi Phi Society along with Robert Baird and Archibald Alexander. He founded the quarterly Biblical Repertory in 1825 to translate the current scholarly literature on the Bible from Europe.

Hodge's study of European scholarship led him to question the adequacy of his training. The seminary agreed to continue to pay him for two years while he traveled in Europe to "round out" his education. He supplied a substitute, John Nevin on his own expense. From 1826 to 1828 he traveled to Paris, where he studied French, Arabic, and Syriac; Halle, where he studied German with George Müller and made the acquaintance of August Tholuck; and Berlin where he attended the lectures of Silvestre de Sacy, Ernst Wilhelm Hengstenberg, and August Neander. There he also became personally acquainted with Friedrich Schleiermacher, the leading modern theologian. He admired the deep scholarship he witnessed in Germany, but thought that the attention given to idealist philosophy clouded common sense, and led to speculative and subjective theology. Unlike other American theologians who spent time in Europe, Hodge's experience did not cause any change in his commitment to the principles of the faith he had learned from childhood.

Starting in the 1830s Hodge suffered from an immobilizing pain in his leg, and was forced to conduct his classes from his study from 1833 to 1836. He continued to write articles for Biblical Repertory, now renamed the Princeton Review. During the 1830s he wrote a major commentary on Romans and a history of the Presbyterian church in America. He supported the Old School in the Old School–New School Controversy, which resulted in a split in 1837. In 1840 he became Professor of Didactic Theology, retaining, however, the department of New Testament exegesis, the duties of which he continued to discharge until his death. He was moderator of the General Assembly of the Presbyterian Church in the United States of America (Old School) in 1846. Hodge's wife died in 1849, shortly followed by Samuel Miller and Archibald Alexander, leaving him the senior professor of the seminary. He was recognized as the leading proponent of the Princeton theology. On his death in 1878 he was recognized by both friends and opponents as one of the greatest polemicists of his time. Of his children who survived him, three were ministers; and two of these succeeded him in the faculty of Princeton Theological Seminary, C. W. Hodge, in the department of exegetical theology, and A. A. Hodge, in that of dogmatics.  A grandson, C. W. Hodge, Jr., also taught for many years at Princeton Seminary.

Literary and teaching activities 

Hodge wrote many biblical and theological works.  He began writing early in his theological career and continued publishing until his death. In 1835 he published his Commentary on the Epistle to the Romans. Although considered to be his greatest exegetical work, Hodge revised this commentary in 1864, in the midst of the American Civil War, and after a debate with James Henley Thornwell about state secession from the Union.

Other works followed at intervals of longer or shorter duration – Constitutional History of the Presbyterian Church in the United States (1840); Way of Life (1841, republished in England, translated into other languages, and circulated to the extent of 35,000 copies in America); Commentary on Ephesians (1856); on First Corinthians (1857); on Second Corinthians (1859). His magnum opus is the Systematic Theology (1871–1873), of 3 volumes and extending to 2,260 pages. His last book, What is Darwinism? appeared in 1874. In addition to all this it must be remembered that he contributed upward of 130 articles to the Princeton Review, many of which, besides exerting a powerful influence at the time of their publication, have since been gathered into volumes, and as Selection of Essays and Reviews from the Princeton Review (1857) and Discussions in Church Polity (ed. W. Durant, 1878) have taken a permanent place in theological literature.

This record of Hodge's literary life is suggestive of the great influence that he exerted. But properly to estimate that influence, it must be remembered that 3,000 ministers of the Gospel passed under his instruction, and that to him was accorded the rare privilege, during the course of a long life, of achieving distinction as a teacher, exegete, preacher, controversialist, ecclesiastic, and systematic theologian. As a teacher he had few equals; and if he did not display popular gifts in the pulpit, he revealed homiletic powers of a high order in the "conferences" on Sabbath afternoons, where he spoke with his accustomed clearness and logical precision, but with great spontaneity and amazing tenderness and unction.

Hodge's literary powers were seen at their best in his contributions to the Princeton Theological Review, many of which are acknowledged masterpieces of controversial writing. They cover a wide range of topics, from apologetic questions that concern common Christianity to questions of ecclesiastical administration, in which only Presbyterians have been supposed to take interest. But the questions in debate among American theologians during the period covered by Hodge's life belonged, for the most part, to the departments of anthropology and soteriology; and it was upon these, accordingly, that his polemic powers were mainly applied.

All of the books that he authored have remained in print over a century after his death.

Character and significance 
Devotion to Christ was the salient characteristic of his experience, and it was the test by which he judged the experience of others. Hence, though a Presbyterian and a Calvinist, his sympathies went far beyond the boundaries of sect. He refused to entertain the narrow views of church polity which some of his brethren advocated. He repudiated the unhistorical position of those who denied the validity of Roman Catholic baptism.

He was conservative by nature, and his life was spent in defending the Reformed theology as set forth in the Westminster Confession of Faith and Larger and Westminster Shorter Catechisms. He was fond of saying that Princeton had never originated a new idea; but this meant no more than that Princeton was the advocate of historical Calvinism in opposition to the modified and provincial Calvinism of a later day. And it is true that Hodge must be classed among the great defenders of the faith, rather than among the great constructive minds of the Church. He had no ambition to be epoch-making by marking the era of a new departure. But he earned a higher title to fame in that he was the champion of his Church's faith during a long and active life, her trusted leader in time of trial, and for more than half a century the most conspicuous teacher of her ministry. Hodges' understanding of the Christian faith and of historical Protestantism is given in his Systematic Theology.

Views on controversial topics

Slavery 
As an archconservative and a believer in both the inerrancy and the literal interpretation of the Bible, Hodge supported the institution of slavery in its most abstract sense, as having support from certain passages in the Bible. He held slaves himself, but he condemned their mistreatment, and made a distinction between slavery in the abstract and what he saw as the unjust Southern Slave Laws that deprived slaves of their right to educational instruction, to marital and parental rights, and that "subject them to the insults and oppression of the whites." It was his opinion that the humanitarian reform of these laws would become the necessary prelude to the eventual end of slavery in the United States.

The Presbyterian General Assembly of 1818 had affirmed a similar position, that slavery within the United States, while not necessarily sinful, was a regrettable institution that ought to eventually be changed. Like the church, Hodge himself had sympathies with both the abolitionists in the North and the pro-slavery advocates in the South, and he used his considerable influence in an attempt to restore order and find common ground between the two factions, with the eventual hope of abolishing slavery altogether.

Hodge's support of slavery was not an inevitable result of his belief in the inerrancy and the literal interpretation of the Bible. Other 19th century Christian contemporaries of Hodge, who also believed in the inerrancy and infallibility of the Bible, denounced the institution of slavery. John Williamson Nevin, a conservative, evangelical Reformed scholar and seminary professor, denounced slavery as 'a vast moral evil.' Hodge and Nevin also famously clashed over polar-opposite views of the Lord's Supper.

Old School 

Hodge was a leader of the Old School faction of Presbyterians during the division of the Presbyterian Church (USA) in 1837. The issues involved conflicts over doctrine, religious practice, and slavery. Although prior to 1861 the Old School refrained from denouncing slavery, the issue was a matter of debate between Northern and Southern components of the denomination.

Civil War 
Hodge could tolerate slavery but he could never tolerate treason of the sort he saw trying to break up the United States in 1861. Hodge was a strong nationalist and led the fight among Presbyterians to support the Union.  In the January 1861 Princeton Review, Hodge laid out his case against secession, in the end calling it unconstitutional. James Henley Thornwell responded in the January 1861 Southern Presbyterian Review, holding that the election of 1860 had installed a new government, one which the South did not agree with, thus making secession lawful.  Despite being a staunch Unionist politically, Hodge voted against the support for the "Spring Resolutions" of the 1861 General Assembly of the Old School Presbyterian Church, thinking it was not the business of the church to involve itself in political matters; because of the resolutions, the denomination then split North and South. When the General Assembly convened in Philadelphia in May 1861, one month after the Civil War began, the resolution stipulated pledging support for the federal government over objections based on concerns about the scope of church jurisdiction and disagreements about its interpretation of the Constitution. In December 1861, the Southern Old School Presbyterian churches severed ties with the denomination.

Darwinism 
In 1874, Hodge published What is Darwinism?, claiming that Darwinism, was, in essence, atheism. To Hodge, Darwinism was contrary to the notion of design and was therefore clearly atheistic. Both in the Review and in What is Darwinism?, (1874) Hodge attacked Darwinism. His views determined the position of the Seminary until his death in 1878. While he didn't consider all evolutionary ideas to be in conflict with his religion, he was concerned with its teaching in colleges. Meanwhile, at Princeton University, a totally separate institution, President John Maclean also rejected Darwin's theory of evolution. However, in 1868, upon Maclean's retirement, James McCosh, a Scottish philosopher, became president. McCosh believed that much of Darwinism could and would be proved sound, and so he strove to prepare Christians for this event. Instead of conflict between science and religion, McCosh sought reconciliation. Insisting on the principle of design in nature, McCosh interpreted the Darwinian discoveries as more evidence of the prearrangement, skill, and purpose in the universe. He thus argued that Darwinism was not atheistic nor in irreconcilable hostility to the Bible. The Presbyterians in America thus could choose between two schools of thought on evolution, both based in Princeton. The Seminary held to Hodge's position until his supporters were ousted in 1929, and the college (Princeton University) became a world class center of the new science of evolutionary biology.

The debate between Hodge and McCosh exemplified an emerging conflict between science and religion over the question of Darwin's evolution theory. However, the two men showed greater similarities regarding matters of science and religion than popularly appreciated. Both supported the increasing role of scientific inquiry in natural history and resisted its intrusion into philosophy and religion.

Works

Books 
 
 
 

  - There is an 1860 reprint available through MOA http://quod.lib.umich.edu/m/moa/AJH0374.0001.001/1 (not in the public domain)

Journals

Sermons

Articles

Modern reprints 
 Systematic Theology. Hendrickson Publishers (1999).  (also available abridged by Edward N. Gross)
 Romans (The Crossway Classic Commentaries). Crossway Books (1994). 
 Romans (Geneva Series of Commentaries). Banner of Truth (June 1, 1998). 
 Corinthians (Crossway Classic Commentaries). Crossway Books (1995). 
 1 & 2 Corinthians (Geneva Series of Commentaries). Banner of Truth (June 1, 1998). 
 2 Corinthians (Crossway Classic Commentaries). Crossway Books (1995). 
 Ephesians (The Crossway Classic Commentaries). Crossway Books (1994). 
 Ephesians (Geneva Series of Commentaries). Banner of Truth (June 1, 1998). 
 The Way of Life (Sources of American Spirituality). Mark A. Noll, ed. Paulist Press (1987).

Notes

Sources 
 

This article includes content derived from the public domain Schaff-Herzog Encyclopedia of Religious Knowledge, 1914.

Further reading 
 Adams, John H. (April 21, 2003). Charles Hodge: A voice for today’s PCUSA? The Layman.
 Anderson, Robert 
 Gutjahr Paul C. Charles Hodge: Guardian of American Orthodoxy  (Oxford University Press; 2011) 477 pages; a standard scholarly biography
 Hicks, Peter (1997). The Philosophy of Charles Hodge: A 19th Century Evangelical Approach to Reason, Knowledge and Truth. Edwin Mellen Pr. 
 Hodge, A. A. (1880). The life of Charles Hodge: Professor in the Theological seminary, Princeton, N.J. C. Scribner's sons. Reissued 1979 by Ayer Co. Pub. 
 Hoffecker, W. A. (1981). Piety and the Princeton Theologians: Archibald Alexander, Charles Hodge, and Benjamin Warfield P&R Publishing. 
 Hoffecker, W. Andrew (2011). Charles Hodge: The Pride of Princeton P&R Publishing. 
 Marsden, George M. Fundamentalism and American Culture (2006)
 Noll, Mark A., ed. (2001). Princeton Theology, 1812–1921: Scripture, Science, and Theological Method from Archibald Alexander to Benjamin Warfield. Baker Publishing Group. 
 Stewart, J. W. and J. H. Moorhead, eds. (2002). Charles Hodge Revisited: A Critical Appraisal of His Life and Work. William B. Eerdmans Publishing Company.

External links 

 
 
 
 The Biblical Repertory and Princeton Review, 1830–82, at the University of Michigan's "Humanities Text Initiative".

1797 births
1878 deaths
19th-century Calvinist and Reformed theologians
American Calvinist and Reformed theologians
American abolitionists
American slave owners
American evangelicals
Burials at Princeton Cemetery
New Testament scholars
Presbyterian abolitionists
Presbyterian Church in the United States ministers
Presidents of Calvinist and Reformed seminaries
Princeton Theological Seminary alumni
Princeton Theological Seminary faculty
Princeton University alumni
Systematic theologians
19th-century American clergy